The following lists events that happened during 1985 in Australia.

Incumbents

Monarch – Elizabeth II
Governor-General – Sir Ninian Stephen
Prime Minister –  Bob Hawke
Deputy Prime Minister – Lionel Bowen
Opposition Leader – Andrew Peacock (until 5 September), then John Howard
Chief Justice – Sir Harry Gibbs

State and Territory Leaders
Premier of New South Wales – Neville Wran
Opposition Leader – Nick Greiner
Premier of Queensland – Sir Joh Bjelke-Petersen
Opposition Leader – Nev Warburton
Premier of South Australia – John Bannon
Opposition Leader – John Olsen
Premier of Tasmania – Robin Gray
Opposition Leader – Ken Wriedt
Premier of Victoria – John Cain Jr.
Opposition Leader – Jeff Kennett
Premier of Western Australia – Brian Burke
Opposition Leader – Bill Hassell
Chief Minister of the Northern Territory – Ian Tuxworth
Opposition Leader – Bob Collins
Chief Minister of Norfolk Island – David Buffett

Governors and Administrators
Governor of New South Wales – Sir James Rowland
Governor of Queensland – Sir James Ramsay (until 21 July), then Sir Walter Campbell
Governor of South Australia – Sir Donald Dunstan
Governor of Tasmania – Sir James Plimsoll 
Governor of Victoria – Sir Brian Murray (until 3 October)
Governor of Western Australia – Gordon Reid
Administrator of Norfolk Island – Raymond Trebilco (until 28 April), then John Matthew
Administrator of the Northern Territory – Eric Johnston

Events

January
1 January – Australia commences a two-year term as a member of the United Nations Security Council.
19 January – A hailstorm accompanied by severe winds sweeps through Brisbane and surrounding areas, causing an estimated $110 million of property damage. Subsequently, around 95,000 insurance claims are lodged.
28 January – Victorian Premier John Cain's support for reforms to the Upper House rather than its abolition defuse this as an election issue.
29 January – Federal Cabinet endorses an earlier decision to provide refuelling facilities to United States aircraft monitoring MX missile tests in the Pacific.  Strong anti-American and anti-nuclear reaction soon forces Prime Minister Bob Hawke to withdraw the offer.

February
1 February – AM stereo broadcasting starts in Australia.
5 February – The United States of America withdraws from a planned ANZUS naval exercise because New Zealand refused to permit nuclear-capable warships to call at its ports. Australia cancels its involvement in U.S.-led MX missile tests.

March
 March – The Bondi beast rapist commits his first assault in Clovelly, New South Wales.
1 March – Uniform credit legislation is introduced in New South Wales, Victoria and Western Australia.
2 March – The ALP government of John Cain reelected in Victoria for a second consecutive term with 47 seats and over 50% of the primary vote. A tied result in Nunawading, decided in Labor's favour, is later declared void by Justice Starke.
4 March – At the request of the United States, the Federal Government cancels the annual meeting of the ANZUS Council.
21 March – The Queensland Government enacts harsh anti-strike legislation.
23 March – Two electric trains collide head on just north of Trinder Park railway station in Woodridge, Queensland at 6.47 a.m.  Two people including a train driver, are killed in the smash, and another 28 people are injured.
30 March – Alderman Sallyanne Atkinson is elected as Brisbane's first female Lord Mayor.
31 March – In excess of 300,000 people throughout Australia march in the Palm Sunday anti-nuclear rallies.

April
20 April – The Duke of Kent officially opens the Queensland Performing Arts Complex at a gala Royal Festival Performance. The opening celebrations – which include a parade, the launching of masses of balloons, fireworks and a fly-over by RAAF aircraft – are scheduled to continue for almost a month.
26 April – Mr. Justice Lionel Murphy is committed for trial on two charges of attempting to pervert the course of justice.
28 April – The Nuclear Disarmament Party (NDP) splits.

May
14 May – Federal Treasurer Paul Keating releases a mini-Budget aimed at reducing Government spending, with cuts falling mainly on defence and the unemployed.
20 May – Queensland police raid the Greenslopes Fertility Clinic, Brisbane and seize the patient files of 20,000 women.  The search warrant is later ruled invalid and the files returned.  Other raids are carried out on clinics in Brisbane and Townsville.  
30 May – At the Premiers' Conference, the Grants Commission makes cuts, especially to the Northern Territory and Queensland.  Business and conservative interests praise Federal Treasurer Paul Keating as a result.

June
2 June - The vehicular ferry Empress of Australia makes its last trip between the mainland and Tasmania.
4 June 
Victoria celebrates its 150th anniversary.
A Government White Paper presents three options for taxation.
24 June - Up to 40,000 farmers march on Parliament House, Melbourne protesting Labor's rural policies.

July
1 July – 4 July – A Tax Summit is held.  Federal Treasurer Paul Keating abandons his preferred Option C (a 12.5% retail sales tax) after a public outcry.
11 July Minister of Transport, Hon. D.F. Lane, M.L.A opened Albion Station.

August
6 August – The merging of two retail chain operations creates Coles Myer Limited.
17 August – The 1985 Nunawading Province state by-election is held for the Victorian Legislative Council seat of Nunawading Province. which Labor loses with a swing of around 4.5% against it, returning minority status to the Legislative Council.
22 August – The Royal Commission on the use and effects of chemical agents on Australian personnel in Vietnam finds no link between the chemical defoliant Agent Orange and the health problems of the Vietnam War veterans.

September
5 September – John Howard replaces Andrew Peacock as federal Liberal leader and thus federal Leader of the Opposition. Neil Brown beats 11 others to become Deputy Leader.
10 September – Simon Crean becomes President of the Australian Council of Trade Unions.
20 September – Capital gains tax is introduced.  The rules allow the cost of assets held for 1 year or more to be indexed by the consumer price index (CPI) before calculating a gain.
21 September – At the inaugural "Light on the Hill" dinner at Bathurst, Prime Minister Bob Hawke describes privatisation as the "height of irrationality" and a "recipe for disaster".

October
3 October – Victorian Premier John Cain announces the resignation of Victorian Governor Sir Brian Murray over his acceptance of discounted air fares from Continental Airlines.  The issue dragged on for several years, causing much embarrassment and recrimination.
9 October – Victorian Police investigate complaints from the Nuclear Disarmament Party on bogus how-to-vote cards issued during the 1985 Nunawading Province state by-election, authorised by Australian Labor Party state secretary Peter Batchelor.
12 October – Canon Arthur Malcolm becomes the first Aboriginal Bishop in Australia.
24 October – South Australian Ombudsman Mary Beasley resigns over much publicity over travel concessions for her partner Susan Mitchell. Her successor Grant Edwards resigns on the same day, subject to an inquiry, with Eugene Biganovsky thus becoming the third to hold the office within the one day.
26 October – The Mutijulu Aboriginal community is given freehold title to Ayers Rock and the Uluru National Park.

November
13 November – Mr. Justice Paul Brereton introduces amendments to the Darling Harbour Bill, stating that the intransigence of the SSC had forced the New South Wales Government to exempt the controversial Sydney Monorail from normal planning controls and claiming that the casino planned for the site would spell the end to illegal gambling.
25 November – A man, later to be revealed as Bruce Goodluck, wears a chicken suit and walks into the House of Representatives and sits on the government front bench but is removed by officers at the request of the deputy speaker, Allan Rocher.

December
2 December – Federal Parliament passes the Australia Act, cutting the nation's last legal and constitutional ties with Britain.
4 December – Retiring New South Wales Local Government Minister Kevin Stewart sacks Warringah Shire Council for negligence and granting favours to a developer.
5 December – The Royal Commission into British atomic tests in Australia (McClelland Royal Commission) severely criticises Britain for violating safety standards and recommends that Britain clean up contaminated areas and pay compensation.
7 December – The Labor government of John Bannon is re-elected for a second term in South Australia.
16 December – New South Wales Premier Neville Wran is charged with contempt of court by the Federal Department of Public Prosecutions in relation to remarks he had made on 28 November when the Appeal Court had ordered a new trial for Mr. Justice Lionel Murphy.
22 December – The new Victorian Governor is announced as academic and Uniting Church minister, Rev. Davis McCaughey, to be sworn in on 18 February 1986.
30 December – Rural discontent at soaring interest rates and falling commodity prices is symbolised by a Canowindra farmer when he dumps 23 tonnes of wheat outside Parliament House in Canberra.  His subsequent prosecution prompts a mass rally of up to 8,000 famers in Canberra on 14 February 1986.

Unknown dates
New South Wales abolishes capital punishment for treason and piracy with violence, thereby abolishing capital punishment from Australia.
The McClelland Royal Commission into the nuclear tests at Maralinga in the 1950s reports its findings.

Arts and literature
18 February – Australia wins the 26th Viña del Mar International Song Festival with the song I can no longer (sung in Spanish as Ya no puedo más), created by K. C. Porter, Turner y Toppano, and sung by Lorenzo Toppano.
9 March – The National Gallery of Australia purchases the painting L'Après-midi à Naples (Afternoon in Naples) by Paul Cézanne for A$1 million.
 Christopher Koch's novel The Doubleman wins the Miles Franklin Award

Film
 Bliss
 Burke & Wills
 The Coca-Cola Kid
 Mad Max Beyond Thunderdome

Television
11 February – Ray Martin takes over Mike Walsh's old daytime slot, replacing The Mike Walsh Show with Midday with Ray Martin.
18 February – Network 0/28 becomes known as SBS.
18 March – Neighbours premieres on the Seven Network. Six months later Neighbours is axed by HSV-7 with the final episode going to air on 8 November 1985. Network Ten subsequently buys the rights and begins screening it from 20 January 1986 where it becomes a hit.
8 June – Hey Hey It's Saturday moves to 6:30 pm Saturdays.

Sport
18 January – First day of the 1985 World Indoor Games in Paris, France, where six Australian athletes are competing: Michael Hillardt (1500 metres), Clayton Kearney (60 and 200 metres), Dave Smith (5000m Walk), Nicole Boegman (Long Jump), Gael Martin (Shot Put), and Deann Mayfield (High Jump). Hillardt wins the gold in the 1500 metres, while Smith claims bronze.
24 March – Robert de Castella is once again Australia's best finisher at the IAAF World Cross Country Championships, this time staged in Lisbon, Portugal. He finishes in 20th place (34:17.0) in the race over 12,190 metres.
9 June – Grenville Wood wins the men's national marathon title, clocking 2:13:37 in Sydney, while Elizabeth Patmore claims the women's title in 2:45:47.
11 June – New South Wales win their first Rugby League State of Origin series.
17 August – North Melbourne play their last game at the Arden Street Oval. North Melbourne defeat Richmond, 16.20.116 to 9.12.66.
28 September – Glenelg defeat North Adelaide for the South Australian National Football League (SANFL) flag.
28 September – The Essendon (26.14.170) defeat the Hawthorn (14.8.92) to win the 89th VFL premiership. It is the second consecutive premiership for Essendon.
29 September – The Canterbury Bulldogs defeat minor premiers the St. George Dragons 7–6 to win the 78th NSWRL premiership. It is also the second consecutive premiership for Canterbury. Illawarra Steelers finish in last position, claiming the wooden spoon.
3 November – The first Formula One Australian Grand Prix takes place on the streets of Adelaide.
5 November – What A Nuisance wins the Melbourne Cup.
4 December – Australia are unable to undo a 2–0 deficit from the first leg and draw 0–0 with Scotland in the World Cup qualifying playoff at Olympic Park, failing to qualify for the 1986 FIFA World Cup.
10 December – 120 members are inducted into the new Sport Australia Hall of Fame.

Births
2 January – Damien Bodie, actor
7 January – Jessica Michalik, teenage girl (died 2001)
12 January – Brad Robbins, basketball player
21 January – Matt Unicomb, basketball player
28 January – Libby Trickett, swimmer
29 January – Isabel Lucas, actress
30 January – Richie Porte, cyclist 
12 February – Saskia Burmeister, actor
13 February – Bridget Neval, actress
17 February – Anne Curtis, actress
18 February – Brad Newley, basketball player
6 March – Yael Stone, actress
7 March 
 Cameron Prosser, swimmer
 Daniel Munday, basketball player
12 March – Nikolai Topor-Stanley, soccer player
13 March – Sean Carlow, figure skater
14 March – Steven Marković, basketball player
19 March – Sean Wroe, track and field sprinter
22 March – Kelli Waite, swimmer
27 March – Danny Vuković, soccer player
8 April – Adrian Bauk, basketball player
13 April – Anna Jennings-Edquist, actress
16 April – Rhiana Griffith, model and actress
17 April – Luke Mitchell, actor
3 May – David Reynolds, racing driver
11 May
Beau Ryan, rugby league player and sportscaster
Jaime Robbie Reyne, actor
22 May – Stephanie Zhang, figure skater
31 May – Matthew Knight, basketball player
5 June – Tim Coenraad, basketball player
10 June – Dane Nielsen, rugby league player
12 June – Sam Thaiday, rugby league player
21 June – Sharna Burgess, ballroom dancer
30 June
 Hugh Sheridan, actor, musician and television presenter
 Lasarus Ratuere, actor
5 July – Stephanie McIntosh, actress
27 July – Aljin Abella, actor
3 August 
 Georgina Haig, actress
 Tim Slade, racing driver
18 August – Brooke Harman, American-born actress
19 August – Gavin Cooper, rugby league player
29 August – Joshua Jefferis, gymnast
30 August – Leisel Jones, swimmer
13 September – Scott Arnold, golfer
29 September – Michelle Payne, jockey
10 October – Ricki-Lee Coulter, singer
14 October – Nicholas Colla, actor
16 October – Casey Stoner, motorcycle racer
23 October – Lachlan Gillespie, singer and actor
24 October – Tim Pocock, actor
5 November – Kate DeAraugo, singer
9 November – Timothy Lang, basketball player
23 December – Luke O'Loughlin, actor

Full Date Unknown
 Neil Erikson, Far Right activist

Deaths
 11 January – William McKell, 12th Governor General of Australia and 27th Premier of New South Wales (b. 1891)
 29 January – Billy Cook, jockey (b. 1910)
 2 April – Doris Fitton, actress and theatrical director (born in the Philippines) (b. 1897)
 3 May – Percy Spender, New South Wales politician and diplomat (b. 1897)
 18 June – John England, New South Wales politician and Administrator of the Northern Territory (b. 1911)
 9 August – Clive Churchill, rugby league player (b. 1927)
 20 August – Ken Kennedy, ice speed skater (b. 1913)
 16 December – Mervyn Waite, cricketer and Australian rules footballer (b. 1911)
 28 December – Sir Henry Winneke, 21st Governor of Victoria and Chief Justice of Victoria (b. 1908)

See also
 1985 in Australian television
 List of Australian films of 1985

References

External links

 
Australia
Years of the 20th century in Australia